This is a timeline documenting the events of heavy metal in the year 1968.

Newly formed bands 
 Accept
 Alice Cooper
 Black Sabbath
 Breakout
 Deep Purple
 Edgar Broughton Band
 Free
 Grand Funk Railroad
 Humble Pie
 Led Zeppelin
 Meat Loaf
 Nazareth
 Rush
 Sir Lord Baltimore
 Sweet
 Warpig
 Writing on the Wall
 Yes

Songs
"Fire" by The Crazy World of Arthur Brown
"Born to Be Wild" by Steppenwolf
"Voodoo Child" by The Jimi Hendrix Experience
"Helter Skelter" by The Beatles
"The House at Pooneil Corners" by Jefferson Airplane
’’Hurdy Gurdy Man’’ by Donovan 
 "A Trial In Our Native Town" by Savage Rose
"In-A-Gadda-Da-Vida" by Iron Butterfly
"Race With the Devil" by The Gun
" Summertime Blues" by Blue Cheer

Albums 
 The Jeff Beck Group - Truth
 The Crazy World of Arthur Brown - The Crazy World of Arthur Brown
 Blue Cheer - Vincebus Eruptum
 Blue Cheer - Outsideinside
 Cream - Wheels of Fire
 Deep Purple - Shades of Deep Purple
 The Jimi Hendrix Experience - Electric Ladyland
 Iron Butterfly - Heavy
 Iron Butterfly - In-A-Gadda-Da-Vida
 The Kinks - The Kinks Are the Village Green Preservation Society
 The Pretty Things - SF Sorrow
 Steppenwolf - Steppenwolf
 Steppenwolf - Steppenwolf the Second
 Vanilla Fudge - The Beat Goes On
 Vanilla Fudge - Renaissance
 The Velvet Underground - White Light/White Heat

References 

1960s in heavy metal music
Metal